Dan Doh!! (stylized as DAN DOH!!) is a Japanese sports manga series written by Nobuhiro Sakata and illustrated by Daichi Banjō. It was serialized in Shogakukan's shōnen manga magazine Weekly Shōnen Sunday from March 1995 to July 2000. It was followed by Dan Doh! Xi (July 2000–April 2003) and Dan Doh! Next Generation (April–December 2004). Dan Doh!! was adapted into an anime television series broadcast on TV Tokyo from April to September 2004.

Plot
Dan Doh!! focuses on a fifth grader named Tadamichi Aoba also nicknamed Dandoh. Dandoh and his two friends are their baseball team's best players, but after an incident with their school principal, they are introduced to the world of golf. Dandoh and his friends are taught by a former professional golfer named Shinjō Mikiyasu, who believes that they can surpass even him. As Dandoh begins to play in tournaments, his friendly spirit, determination, and hard working and competitive attitude brings the best in the players around him and earns him many friends.

Characters

Tadamichi Aoba, also called Dandoh by his friends, was originally a talented baseball player with the ability to hit long-distance home runs. He is introduced to golf by his school's principal. Dandoh quits baseball and decides to play golf instead partly after hearing he could win 30 million yen in a tournament. He believes if he wins the money, his mother would come back after she left him, his older sister, and his father because of money problems. His nickname comes from an alternate pronunciation of his given name, the Japanese word dandō (弾道, lit. "trajectory").

Yuka Sunada is Dandoh's friend who follows him to play golf. She constantly worries about Dandoh, but also gets excited after his accomplishments. Yuka's swinging pivot is firm, which allows her to keep her form when under pressure and even when being harassed during her first tournament game. She has a calm and kind personality. Yuka shows talent in golf like Aoba whom she hold strong feelings for.

Kōhei Ooike is Dandoh's friend who follows him to play golf. He also played baseball and could hit further than Dandoh. Along with his strength to hit the ball far, Kōhei excels in putting.

Shinjō Mikiyasu was a Japanese pro golfer who won a tournament over fictional pro golfer Jimmy McGray a year and seven months prior to the beginning of the story. His career came to an end after a car accident, which left him unable to swing a golf club. He envies Dandoh because he has good friends that back him up, thus agrees to teach Dandoh, Yuka, and Kōhei after they show him their determination and patience.

Media

Manga
Dan Doh!! is written by Nobuhiro Sakata and illustrated by Daichi Banjō. It was serialized in Shogakukan's Weekly Shōnen Sunday from March 29, 1995 to July 5, 2000. Shogakukan compiled its chapters into twenty-nine tankōbon volumes, published from September 18, 1995 to November 18, 2000.

The manga was followed by a sequel, titled Dan Doh! Xi, which ran in Weekly Shōnen Sunday from the July 19, 2000 to April 23, 2003. Shogakukan collected its chapters into fifteen tankōbon, published from December 18, 2000 to May 17, 2003.

A third series, titled , was serialized in Weekly Shōnen Sunday from April 7, 2004 to December 15, 2004. Shogakukan compiled its chapters into four tankōbon, published from July 16, 2004 to January 18, 2005.

Anime
Dan Doh!! was adapted into a 26-episode anime television series which was broadcast on TV Tokyo from April 3 to September 25, 2004.

Dan Doh!! was licensed for North American distribution by Bandai Entertainment, which they announced at Anime Expo 2004 when they wanted to establish a strong presence in the sports genre. The English dub was produced by Odex Pte Ltd., a Singapore-based anime licensor company.

Episode list

Theme songs
Opening theme
 "Going On" by Bullet 77

Ending themes
 "Wild Flower ~ Hana ni Arashi no Tatoe ari ~ " (WILD FLOWER ~花に嵐の喩えあり~) by Bullet 77 (Episodes 1-13)
 "Believe In Love" by Bullet 77 (Episodes 14-25)
 "Going On" by Bullet 77 (Episode 26)

References

External links
Official Dan Doh!! anime site at TV Tokyo  

1995 manga
2004 anime television series debuts
2004 manga
Bandai Entertainment anime titles
Golf in anime and manga
Odex
Shogakukan manga
Shōnen manga
TV Tokyo original programming